Modesto Méndez Amador (born 6 January 1998) is a Cuban footballer who plays as a defender for Inter Miami CF II in MLS Next Pro, and the Cuba national team.

Career

Inter Miami CF II
After joining the club in early 2020, Méndez made his debut for the club on 18 July 2020, tallying 63 minutes before being replaced by Ian Fray in a 2–0 defeat to Greenville Triumph.

On 12 July 2021, Méndez joined USL Championship side Charleston Battery on a short-term loan deal.

International career
Méndez debuted for the Cuba national team in a 1–0 2022 FIFA World Cup qualification win over Saint Vincent and the Grenadines on 8 June 2021.

References

External links

1998 births
Living people
People from Pinar del Río
Cuban footballers
Cuba international footballers
Inter Miami CF II players
USL League One players
Association football defenders
Cuban expatriate footballers
Cuban expatriate sportspeople in the United States
Expatriate soccer players in the United States
FC Pinar del Río players
Charleston Battery players
USL Championship players
MLS Next Pro players